The Best FIFA Women's Player is a football award presented annually by the sport's governing body, FIFA, since 2016, to honour the player deemed to have performed the best over the previous calendar year.  From 2001 to 2015, the award was known as the FIFA Women's World Player of the Year.

History
The selection criteria for the players of the year are: sporting performance, as well as general conduct on and off the pitch.

The votes are decided by media representatives, national team coaches, and national team captains. In October 2016, it was announced that the general public would also be allowed to vote. Each group has 25% of the overall vote.

At the 2017 awards, 2016 FIFA U-17 Women's World Cup Bronze Ball and Bronze Shoe winner and amateur club player Deyna Castellanos was nominated. Professional players Megan Rapinoe and Sam Kerr criticized the nomination.

Winners

Wins by player

Wins by country

Wins by club

FIFA Player of the Year (including predecessors)

See also
 List of sports awards honoring women
 FIFA Women's World Player of the Year
 The Best FIFA Football Awards
 Ballon d'Or Féminin

Notes

References

External links
 Official FIFA website
 Official Facebook website

The Best FIFA Football Awards
 Fifa W
Awards established in 2016